USS S-8 (SS-113) was a second-group ( or "Government") S-class submarine of the United States Navy. Her keel was laid down on 9 November 1918 by the Portsmouth Navy Yard. She was launched on 21 April 1920 sponsored by Mrs. Roy W. Ryden, and commissioned on 1 October 1920.

S-8 sailed from Newport, Rhode Island on 7 December 1920 and was attached to Submarine Division 12 (SubDiv 12). After her division had rendezvoused with SubDiv 18 off New Hampshire, they proceeded via the Panama Canal and California to Hawaii, arriving at Pearl Harbor on 15 April 1921. Departing Pearl Harbor on 3 November, they arrived at Cavite, Luzon, in the Philippines on 1 December. This voyage set a record for American submarines, at that time, as the longest cruise ever undertaken. Other submarines — which had operated on the Asiatic station prior to this — were transported overseas on the decks of colliers.

The two divisions — which comprised Submarine Flotilla 3 (SubFlot 3) — operated out of Cavite for the next three years, with annual visits to ports in China. They finally departed Cavite on 29 October 1924, and arrived at Mare Island, California on 30 December.

S-8 remained at Mare Island through 1925, operated along the West Coast during 1926, and sailed on 10 February 1927 for the Panama Canal Zone. She operated at Coco Solo from March into April, and then sailed for New London, Connecticut, arriving on 3 May.

S-8 spent the next three years operating along the New England coast, out of New London, with the exception of training cruises to the Panama Canal area from February–April 1928, January–April 1929, and January–March 1930.

Departing New London on 22 October, S-8 sailed to Philadelphia, Pennsylvania, where she was decommissioned on 11 April 1931. She was struck from the Naval Vessel Register on 25 January 1937.

References 

Ships built in Kittery, Maine
S-08
1920 ships